Kingdom of the South (Italian: Regno del Sud) is the definition used in Italian historiography regarding the part of southern Italy controlled by the Allied Military Government of Occupied Territories (AMGOT) and ruled by AMGOT in cooperation with governments of the Kingdom of Italy (initially with Pietro Badoglio and later Ivanoe Bonomi as prime ministers), as opposed to German-occupied northern and central Italy, where the Italian Social Republic had been established. The term refers to the period between September 1943, when King Victor Emmanuel III and the government fled Rome to Brindisi in the aftermath of the armistice of Cassibile, and June 1944, when Rome was liberated by the Allies and resumed its function as capital of Italy. Regno del Sud was not an official designation; all documents and acts referred to it as the Kingdom of Italy. In the historiographic field, the term is also used to extensively identify the period up to 1945 and end of war, that is, until Italy was still divided and the Italian government, which had re-established itself in Rome, it did not have full control of the territory and local, police and military bodies. In that situation, the administrative, military and political deeds and the relative documentation were divided among those managed by the government of Rome, by the Italian Social Republic, by the partisan forces and by the armies in the field. At its outset in September 1943, the Kingdom of the South only controlled Apulia, Sardinia, and parts of Basilicata and Calabria. Sicily, at the time under AMGOT administration following its capture during Operation Husky in the summer of 1943, was returned to the control of the Italian government in February 1944. More territories came under the control of the Southern Kingdom as the Allies advanced northwards along the Italian peninsula. The king and government initially established their seat in Brindisi and later in Salerno, even though neither city was officially designated as the capital of Italy. The sovereignty of the kingdom was de facto limited, as it was subject to the Allied Control Commission for Italy.

References

History of Italy
Italy in World War II